Triraphideae is a small tribe of tropical grasses, containing 14 species in three genera. Like most of the subfamily Chloridoideae, species in the tribe use the C4 photosynthetic pathway.

References

Chloridoideae
Poaceae tribes